Manal Kayiru 2 is a 2016 Indian Tamil-language comedy drama film directed by Madhan Kumar, starring S. Ve. Shekher, Jaishree, Ashwin Shekhar and Poorna. The film is a sequel to the 1982 film, Manal Kayiru and Shekher, Visu, and Kuriakose Ranga reprise their roles from the original. The film received negative reviews and was a box-office bomb. This is the last film for Visu before his death.

Plot

Cast 

S. Ve. Shekhar as Kittumani
Ashwin Shekhar as  Arjun
Poorna as Nisha
Visu as Naradhar Naidu
Reshma Pasupuleti as Chandra
Jayashree as Uma Kittumani
Swaminathan as Broker Swaminathan
Chaams as Santhakumar
Jagan
Delhi Ganesh as Doctor
M. S. Bhaskar as Astrologer
Kuriakose Ranga as Lakshmanaswamy
Namo Narayana as Arivu
Sonia as TV Host
Lollu Sabha Manohar
George Vijay as George
Suraj Raja as Roshan
Bharathi
Caroline
Bala Guru
Dharan Kumar in a cameo appearance

Soundtrack 
The soundtrack was composed by Dharan.

Reception 
Deccan Chronicle wrote that "On the whole, it is enjoyable most part of it". The Hindu opined that "It’s quite clear that if Manal Kayiru 2 was made into a play, it would mean repeating this flaccid attempt at humour hundreds of times". The Times of India stated that "Manal Kayiru 2 lacks innovativeness in the plot, and the unconvincing characterisations rub salt in the wound". Sify said "Among the other actors, SV Shekar, Visu, Lollu Sabha Swaminathan and Chams steal the show that they are the ones, who make us to sit through such a badly made film". Maalai Malar gave a mixed review.

References

External links 
 

2010s Tamil-language films
2016 comedy-drama films
2016 films
Filma scored by Dharan Kumar
Films scored by Dharan Kumar
Indian comedy-drama films
Indian sequel films